The Hathaways is a 26-episode situation comedy, which aired on ABC from October 6, 1961, to March 30, 1962, starring Peggy Cass and Jack Weston as suburban Los Angeles "parents" to a trio of performing chimpanzees. Weston portrayed Walter Hathaway, a flabby real estate agent. Cass is his zany bride Elinore, "mother" and booking agent to the Marquis Chimps, named Candy, Charlie, and Enoch. The chimps had earlier appeared on CBS's The Ed Sullivan Show, a Jack Benny special in 1959 and several commercials in 1960.

Ratings for the Screen Gems series were so low that ABC had largely to self-sponsor the program (although the series was sponsored on alternate weeks, throughout most of the season, by Ralston-Purina). The writers included Tom Adair and James B. Allardice; story consultants were Hugh Wedlock and Howard Snyder, who co-wrote the premiere episode with Dick Wesson.

Episode list

Reception
Latter-day television critics Castleman and Podrazik (1982) have called The Hathaways "possibly the worst series ever to air on network TV", criticizing the production, scripts, acting, the "utterly degrading" premise, and the overall "total worthlessness" of the program.

References

External links 

 

1960s American sitcoms
1961 American television series debuts
1962 American television series endings
American Broadcasting Company original programming
Black-and-white American television shows
Television series by Screen Gems
Television shows set in Los Angeles
Television shows about chimpanzees